Honorana is a monotypic moth genus in the family Geometridae. Its only species is Honorana notaturia. Both the genus and species were first described by Blanchard in 1852.

References

Geometridae
Monotypic moth genera